The 1995 Australian Grand Prix (officially the LX EDS Australian Grand Prix) was a Formula One motor race held on 12 November 1995 at the Adelaide Street Circuit, Adelaide. The race, contested over 81 laps, was the seventeenth and final race of the 1995 Formula One season, and the eleventh and last Australian Grand Prix to be held at Adelaide before the event moved to Melbourne the following year. This would also prove to be the last Grand Prix for Mark Blundell, Bertrand Gachot, Roberto Moreno, Taki Inoue and Karl Wendlinger.

In a race of attrition, all the front-running cars retired except for the pole-sitting Williams-Renault of Damon Hill. Hill won by two clear laps, only the second time this had been achieved in Formula One history. Ligier-Mugen-Honda driver Olivier Panis was second, with Gianni Morbidelli achieving his best-ever F1 result with third in a Footwork-Hart. Of the 23 drivers who started, only eight finished, the lowest number in the 1995 season. , this is the last time the race winner lapped every other competitor.

The Grand Prix had a record attendance of 520,000 during the weekend, with 210,000 on race day, a Formula One record until , when 250,000 people attended that year's United States Grand Prix at Indianapolis.

Report

Pre-race 
Heading into the final round of the 1995 Formula One season, both the Drivers' Championship and Constructors' Championship were already settled, with Michael Schumacher having claimed the Drivers' Championship two rounds earlier at the Pacific Grand Prix. It was Schumacher's last race with the Benetton team, before his move to Ferrari for the 1996 season. Benetton had claimed the Constructors' Championship at the previous event, the Japanese Grand Prix, with Williams too many points behind to be able to catch them. It was announced beforehand that it would be the last Formula One event to be held at the Adelaide Street Circuit, with the Australian Grand Prix moving to Melbourne Grand Prix Circuit in Melbourne from the 1996 season.

In the Friday afternoon qualifying session, Mika Häkkinen in his McLaren car suffered a puncture in his left rear tyre heading towards Brewery Bend. This caused him to lose control, become airborne and crash heavily into a tyre barrier at 120 mph. The impact caused his helmet to strike the steering wheel, fracturing his skull. Within seconds he was attended by two doctors who were stationed at the corner, who found Hakkinen unresponsive and with a blocked airway. Häkkinen later said that he was aware of what had happened immediately after the impact, but subsequently lost consciousness. Unable to establish an airway, the doctors performed an emergency tracheotomy before taking him to the nearby Royal Adelaide Hospital. Häkkinen would recover in time to race the following season.

The Williams' cars dominated qualifying, with Damon Hill in pole position and David Coulthard alongside him. Schumacher was third in his Benetton, with the Ferrari drivers fourth and fifth, Gerhard Berger ahead of Jean Alesi. Heinz-Harald Frentzen rounded out the top six in his Sauber.

Race 
The race took place in the afternoon from 14:00 ACDT (UTC+10:30). Hill lost the lead to Coulthard at the start. Schumacher also lost ground at the start, with Berger moving into third and Alesi moving into fourth. Schumacher made his way back up to third, overtaking Alesi on lap one, before overtaking Berger a few laps later. Coulthard kept the lead until the first round of pitstops. However, he came into the pitlane too fast, locking his front tyres and running into the pitwall. He was forced to retire from the race. A few laps later, Forti's Roberto Moreno had spun and caused terminal damage to his suspension in the same place where Coulthard had crashed earlier.

After the first round of pitstops, Schumacher and Alesi collided, with both retiring. Schumacher's Benetton team-mate, Johnny Herbert took second place briefly before coming in for his first stop later than many of the other drivers, while surviving a potential accident in which he missed the pit entry and rejoined the track. Berger was promoted to second, but his Ferrari encountered an engine problem, forcing him to retire. This promoted Frentzen to second, but he too retired due to a gearbox problem. With many of the front-runners out, Hill led at the front, even with a 22-second botched pit stop, with Herbert second. Jordan driver Eddie Irvine rounded out the top three, before retiring after losing all of his pneumatic pressure. Herbert was still second, and looked set as a result to claim third place in the Drivers' Championship. However, he was forced out of the race as his Benetton suffered a driveshaft failure. Olivier Panis was now second in his Ligier a lap behind Hill, with Footwork driver Gianni Morbidelli third, two laps down. With a few laps remaining, Panis' Ligier was suffering an oil leak, and Hill lapped him for a second time on his way to victory. Panis remained second, with Morbidelli third for his only career podium, and the first podium for the Footwork/Arrows team in six years. Behind the top three, Mark Blundell was fourth in the sole McLaren, with Mika Salo fifth in the Tyrrell. Pedro Lamy had a mid-race spin, but recovered to take sixth in his Minardi – his only Formula One point, and Minardi's last until the 1999 European Grand Prix. Only eight cars finished the race, with Pedro Diniz seventh place being Forti's best Formula One finish. The eighth place for Pacific also equalled their best result since the 1995 German Grand Prix. The race was televised by Channel 9 in Australia and by the BBC in the UK.

The race marked the end of Pacific Racing, as the team went back to International Formula 3000 for 1996. In a last gasp effort, Pacific tried to have their test driver Oliver Gavin in the seat, but he was not granted an FIA Super License and shareholder Bertrand Gachot raced instead. It was only the second time in Formula One history that the winner won by two laps– the first time was at the 1969 Spanish Grand Prix when Jackie Stewart won. Hill, who had been criticised for his performances in all of the three previous races, was praised by commentator Murray Walker for this performance, with Walker saying that, with Schumacher and Coulthard's imminent moves to Ferrari and McLaren respectively, Hill would be a strong favourite to win the title in 1996 if he could continue to perform in the way he had done so in this particular race. This would also be the last race for a V12 engine. Only Ferrari used this configuration, but would switch to a more fuel-efficient V10 engine for 1996.

Although he failed to finish, by competing in the race Gerhard Berger became the only driver to have driven in all 11 Formula One Grands Prix held in Adelaide. He had driven for Arrows-BMW (1985), Benetton-BMW (1986), Ferrari (1987, 1988, 1989, 1993, 1994, 1995) and McLaren-Honda (1990, 1991, 1992), winning the race for Ferrari in 1987 (as well as claiming pole position and fastest lap) and McLaren in 1992.

The post-race concert was headlined by American rock band Bon Jovi, who performed at the Victoria Park Racecourse as part of their These Days Tour.

Classification

Qualifying

Race

Championship standings after the race

Drivers' Championship standings

Constructors' Championship standings

 Note:   Only the top five positions are included for both sets of standings.

References 

Grand Prix
Australian Grand Prix
Australian Grand Prix
Motorsport in Adelaide
1990s in Adelaide
Sports competitions in Adelaide
Australian Grand Prix